Ras  Makonnen Wolde Mikael Wolde Melekot (Amharic: ራስ መኮንን ወልደ ሚካኤል ወልደ መለኮት; 8 May 1852 – 21 March 1906), or simply  Ras Makonnen, also known as Abba Qagnew (አባ ቃኘው), was a Shewan royal from Menz, a military leader, the governor of Harar province in the Ethiopian Empire, and the father of Tafari Makonnen (later known as Emperor Haile Selassie). His father was Dejazmach Wolde Mikael Wolde Melekot of Shewa. Makonnen was a grandson of Negus Sahle Selassie of Shewa through his mother, Woizero Tenagnework Sahle Selassie. As such, he was a first cousin of the Ethiopian Emperor, Menelik II.

He is best remembered as being one of the most effective generals during the First Italo-Ethiopian War, playing a key role at the Battle of Adwa and the Battle of Amba Alagi.

Biography

Governorship 

Ras Makonnen Wolde Mikael Wolde Melekot
was born at Derefo Maryam near Ankober,  in what was then in the province of Menz to his mother Woizero Tenagnework Sahle Selassie and his father Dejazmach Wolde Mikael Wolde Melekot, who was the governor of the provinces Menz and Doba (which are located in Semien Shewa). Ras Makonnen paternal descent is disputed between Amhara, Oromo or Tigray. His maternal lineage is ethnically Amhara with a Solomonic genealogy, his mother was a daughter of Sahle Selassie of Shewa. At the age of 14 his father took him to the court of Negus Menelik, then ruler of Shewa, where he became a special companion of Menelik.

In 1887, Makonnen was given the governorship of Harar after it was incorporated into the Ethiopian Empire by his cousin, Emperor Menelik following the Battle of Chelenqo. According to Jules Borelli, Harar was pillaged by Abyssinian soldiers with half its population fleeing, despite pleas from the despoiled locals to Makonnen. The Harari people soon revolted which followed Makonnen storming the town with his troops razing and plundering residences as well as massacring the population. According to Hararis, the oppression of Harari people began with the invasion of Harar by Ras Makonnen which followed mosques changed into churches and Abyssinian Christians arriving from the north to settle in the town. Makonnen had ordered the primary mosque of Harar to be replaced by an Orthodox Church. Immediately after obtaining governance of Harar, Makonnen set about undermining Harari wealth by expropriating their land and offering it to his soldiers.

Other posts Ras Makonnen served included temporary governor of Tigray after the removal of the rebellious Ras Mangasha Yohannes, And as a general during various military campaigns including during the First Italo–Ethiopian War, including a leading role at the Battle of Adwa where Ethiopian forces routed the Italians; and as a diplomat and de facto foreign minister.

In the 1880s, as Shum of Harar, Ras Mäkonnen became a close friend of the French poet, Arthur Rimbaud, who was then living and doing business in that province.

In 1902, Ras Mäkonnen attended the coronation of King Edward VII in London. He arrived in June to the ceremony originally scheduled for 26 June, and stayed in Europe while the King recovered from an operation, attending the rescheduled ceremony on 9 August. Between these dates, he paid visits to various parts of the United Kingdom, and visited Italy, France, Turkey, and Germany. He received the following decorations: Knight Commander of the Order of St. Michael and St. George (KCMG) during an audience with King Edward VII on 8 August 1902, Star of the Russian Order of St. Anne, Star of the French Legion d'Honneur (Third Republic), Star of the Order of the Crown of Italy, Star of the Ottoman Order of Osmania.

In 1906, Dejazmach Yilma Makonnen succeeded Makonnen as Shum of Harar. Yilma Makonnen was his son from before his marriage to Wayzero Yeshimabet Ali. In 1907, Yilma Makonnen was in turn succeeded as Shum by his younger half-brother, Tafari Makonnen, the future Emperor Haile Selassie.

Family 
Around July 1873, Makonnen married Yeshimebet Ali, the daughter of Dejazmach Ali and Woizero Wolete Giyorgis. In 1875, Yilma Makonnen was born to Makonnen and a woman who was not Yeshimebet Ali. In 1892, Tafari Makonnen, the son of Makonnen and Yeshimebet Ali, was born. In 1901, following the death of Yeshimebet Ali, Makonnen was briefly married to a niece of Empress Taytu Betul, Woizero Mentewab Wale. Makonnen's marriage to Mentewab Wale was never consummated and, in 1902, it was annulled.

Death 
While travelling from Harar to Addis Ababa, Ras Makonnen came down with typhus. His officers brought him to Kulubi, where he died as daylight broke after having given his son Tafari Makonnen a whispered benediction.

Monument to Ras Makonnen 

The Monument to Ras Makonnen previously located in Harar was sculpted in 1959, by Antun Augustinčić, a Croatian sculptor active in former Yugoslavia and the United States. In June 2020 the equestrian Monument to Ras Makonnen was toppled and destroyed by Oromo mobs who participated in Hachalu Hundessa riots, following the death of Hachalu Hundessa. It is alleged the Harari Regional state police officers supported its removal. The event was also followed by smashing of the Statue of Ras Makonnen Wolde Mikael's son and Ethiopian leader Haile Selassie in Wimbledon park, UK. Referring to a statue in Addis Ababa of Menelik II, Hachalu told Oromia Media Network (OMN) said that people should remember that all the horses seen mounted by old rulers leaders belonged to the people.

Notes 
Footnotes

Citations

References

External links 

19th-century Ethiopian people
Deaths from typhus
Ethiopian princes
Ethiopian Royal Family
Ethiopian Oriental Orthodox Christians
Ethiopian Orthodox Christians
Oriental Orthodox monarchs
Honorary Knights Commander of the Order of St Michael and St George
Solomonic dynasty
1852 births
1906 deaths
20th-century Ethiopian people